Amirabad-e Nadar (also Romanized as Amīrābād-e Nadar and Amīrābād-e Nader; also known as Amīrābād-e Pāpī and Amīrābād-e Papī) is a village in Qaleh-ye Mozaffari Rural District, in the Central District of Selseleh County, Lorestan Province, Iran. At the 2006 census, its population was 161, in 36 families.

References 

Towns and villages in Selseleh County